A list of watermills in the United States.

Working mills
Alabama
 Chandlers Mill, 45ft working water wheel & Gristmill, built 1860 Centre, Alabama
 Kymulga Mill, Childersburg

Arkansas
 War Eagle Mill, Rogers, built 1832 and still in operation commercially as an undershot grist mill

California
 Bale Grist Mill, Napa

Connecticut
 Main Sawmill, Ledyard, Connecticut
 Winthrop Mill, New London, Connecticut, built circa 1650
Georgia
 Historic mills of the Atlanta area
 Old Mill at Berry College, Rome
 Nora Mill at Helen, Georgia

Illinois
 Franklin Creek Grist Mill, Franklin Creek State Natural Area, Franklin Grove, Illinois
 Graue Mill and Museum, Oak Brook

Indiana
 Beck's Mill, Becks Mill
 Bonneyville Mill, Bristol. Built mid-1830s and still operates May through October (see Elkhart County Parks and Recreation)
 Mansfield Roller Mill, Mansfield. Built in 1820.  Currently operated by Indiana DNR.
 Metamora Grist Mill, Metamora. Built in 1899 and restored in 1970. Produces high quality stone-ground corn meal.
 Spring Mill State Park, Mitchell
 Stockdale Mill, Roann
 Bridgeton Mill, Bridgeton. Established 1823, family owned and operating.
 Greenfield Mills, near Howe. Family owned and operating.

Iowa
 Pine Creek Gristmill, Wildcat Den State Park, near Muscatine

Kentucky
 Mill Springs Overshot Waterwheel located at Mill Springs Park, located in Mill Springs, Kentucky. The current mill built in 1877 on the site of a previous mill. Currently owned and operated as a park by the United States Army Corps of Engineers. The wheel has a diameter of 40 feet, 10 inches, and a breast of three feet. Powered by 13 natural springs located beside the mill, it is thought to be one of the largest of its kind in the world.

Maine
 Bog Mill, Buxton
Dexter Grist Mill, Dexter, built in 1854
 Maine Forest & Logging Museum also known as Leonard's Mills, has Maine's only operational saw mill.
 Morgan's Mills in Union, Maine produces wholesale grist mill products.
 Scribner's Mills in Harrison, Maine is working on reconstructing an up-and-down sawmill.

Maryland
 Wye Mill c.1682 The oldest continuously operating grist mill in the United States. Supplied flour to George Washington's Continental Army. One of the first grist mills to be automated by Oliver Evans. The Oliver Evans process equipment is still in use at the Wye Mill. Open mid-April to mid-November. www.oldwyemill.org

Massachusetts
 Dexter Grist Mill, Sandwich, built in 1654, fully restored in 1961
 Jenney Grist Mill, Plymouth, built in 1969 on site of 1636 grist mill
 Old Schwamb Mill, Arlington, built in 1861 with operations on the site dating to 1684
 Old Stockbridge Grist Mill, Scituate, built ca. 1650
 Sturbridge Village grist mill, Sturbridge, built 1939
 Wayside Inn Grist Mill, Sudbury, built 1929 by Henry Ford

Michigan
 Pears Mill, Buchanan

Minnesota
 Pickwick Mill, Pickwick, built in 1858
 Schech's Mill, Caledonia, built in 1876

Mississippi
 Sciple's Water Mill in Kemper County, built in 1790 and owned by four families over the next fifty years. The Sciple family bought the property in about 1840 and has kept it running ever since. This mill also ginned cotton and sawed lumber until the 1950s.

Missouri
 Hodgson Mill, Ozark County
 Bollinger Mill, Burfordville
 Dillard Mill, Crawford County

Nebraska
 Florence Mill, Omaha

New Hampshire
 Littleton Grist Mill, Littleton
 Sanborn grist and saw mill, Loudon now known as Sanborn Farm Mills

New Jersey

Cooper Mill, Chester

New York
 Mill Dam Bridge (tide mill), Centerport
 Roslyn Grist Mill, Roslyn
 Stony Brook Grist Mill, Stony Brook
 Tuthilltown Gristmill, Gardiner
 Enfield Falls Mill and Miller's House, Enfield
 Water Mill (Water Mill, New York)
   Mills at Green Hole, Claverack NY:  Early 1700s Fully operational water-powered saw mill, cider press, blacksmith shop, & woodworking shop

North Carolina

 Dellingers Mill, Bakersville, seasonally operational, water powered, 1867
 Emmett Isaacs Mill, Surry County
 Gwynn Valley Camp Mill, Brevard, Transylvania County 
 Linneys Mill, Alexander County, 1902
 Mingus Mill, Cherokee
 Old Mill of Guilford, Oak Ridge. Fully operational water-powered grist mill. Founded in 1767, moved 500 feet downstream to current location in 1819. According to legend, Revolutionary War British troops seized the original mill prior to the Battle of Guilford Courthouse in March 1781.
 West Point Mill, Durham
 Yates Mill, Wake County

Ohio
 Lantermans Mill Youngstown, Ohio http://www.millcreekmetroparks.org/visit/places/mill-creek-park/lantermans-mill/
 Bear's Mill
 Clifton Mill, Clifton, one of the oldest grist mills still in operation
 Indian Mill, Upper Sandusky

Oregon
 Thompson's Mills, Shedd, OR, 1858, on the Calapooia River, now an Oregon State Heritage Site, Thompson's Mills State Heritage Site
 Butte Creek Mill, Eagle Point, OR, 1872, Little Butte Creek

Pennsylvania
 Bohrmans Mill, near Orwigsburg
 The Mill at Anselma (Lightfoot Mill), Chester Springs
 Newlin Mill Complex, Concordville
 Shoaff's Mill, Little Buffalo State Park, Perry County
 McConnell's Mill, McConnells Mill State Park, Lawrence County, Pennsylvania

Rhode Island
 Carpenter's Grist Mill, Perryville, built in 1703
 Hammond Gristmill at Gilbert Stuart Birthplace in Saunderstown, Rhode Island, built in 1757
 Kenyon's Grist Mill, West Kingston, current mill building was built in 1886, (operation founded in 1696)

South Carolina
 Boykin Mill, Boykin, an operating grist mill where meal and grits have been ground by water power for over 150 years.
 Suber's Corn Mill, Greer, built in 1908 by Walter Hillary Suber. It was constructed on  that was passed down from his father, James Ashfield Suber, who was a Civil War veteran. This was one of five mills within a  radius in the early 1900s.

Tennessee
 Cable Mill at Cades Cove, Great Smoky Mountains National Park
 Falls Mill, Belvidere (has a bed and breakfast plus museum)
 Pigeon Forge Mill, Pigeon Forge
 Rice Grist Mill, Rocky Top, Norris Dam State Park
 Gap Creek Mill at Cumberland Gap, The Olde Mill Inn Bed & Breakfast

Virginia
 Burwell-Morgan Mill, Millwood, built in 1782–85, still grinding a variety of grains, powered by an indoor waterwheel
 Locke's Mill, Berryville, Virginia, Colonial-era grist mill on the Shenandoah River. Grinding a variety of grains including certified organic, powered by water wheel. www.lockesmillgrains.com 
 McCormick Mill, Raphine, Virginia, grist mill located on the Cyrus McCormick Farm.
 Causey's Mill, Causey Mill Park, Newport News
 George Washington's Gristmill, Mount Vernon
 Kennedy-Wade Mill, Raphine

Washington
 Cedar Creek Grist Mill, Washington

West Virginia
 Glade Creek Grist Mill in Babcock State Park, Fayette County

Wisconsin
 Beckman Mill, Newark, Wisconsin
Cedarburg Mill, Cedarburg
Concordia Mill, Cedarburg

Extant non-operational mills

 Forbes Mill, Los Gatos, California
 Rhodes Mill, Fertile, Iowa
 Greenbank Mill, Marshallton, Delaware, restored as a museum
 Fair Haven Flour Mill, Fairhaven, Minnesota
 Phelps Mill, Underwood, Minnesota
 Pillsbury A Mill, Minneapolis, Minnesota
 Terrace Mill, Terrace, Minnesota
 Wolf Creek Grist Mill, Loudonville, Ohio
 Price's Mill, Parksville, South Carolina
 Box Elder Flouring Mill (1857), Brigham City, Utah
 Planing Mill of Brigham City Mercantile and Manufacturing Association (1876), Brigham City, Utah
 Causey's Mill, Newport News, Virginia
 Thomas Mill, West Whiteland Township, Pennsylvania
 Thorp Mill, Thorp, Washington
 Peirce Mill, Washington, D.C.
 Hilgen and Wittenberg Woolen Mill, Cedarburg, Wisconsin

Ruined, remnant, or partially preserved gristmills

 Boshell's Mill, Townley, Alabama
 Gurleyville Grist Mill and Gurley-Mason Mill, Mansfield, Connecticut
 Cooch-Dayett Mills, Newark, Delaware a mill complex since the 1700s, the only remaining mill was built in 1838 by William Cooch, Jr.
 Dingley's Mill, Green Valley, Fairfield, CA.  1850, in ruins now.  40 water wheel.  http://www.bellavistaranch.net/suisun_history/dingley_mill-dingler.html
 Hearn's Mill, Seaford, Delaware
 Ward Spoke Mill, in ruins on Upper Pike Creek Road in Newark, Delaware
 Blantons Mill,  Blanton Mill Rd. Griffin, Ga, restored as an office on the  banks of the Flint River,  built around the early 1800s
 Wapsipinicon Grist Mill in Independence, Iowa; owned by the Buchanan County Historical Society
 Matthews Mill, Union, ME. Built circa 1850, now an endangered local landmark
 Archibald Mill, Dundas, Minnesota
 Marine Mill, Marine on St. Croix, Minnesota, operated 1839–1895, ruins preserved in a park
 Mill Ruins Park, Minneapolis, Minnesota
 Ramsey Mill, Hastings, Minnesota, ruins preserved in a park
 Oxford Mill Ruin, Stanton Township, Minnesota
 Falling Spring Mill, New Liberty, Missouri
 Greer Mill, Greer, Missouri slated for restoration by U.S. National Forest Service
 Montauk Mill, Salem, Missouri National Register of Historic Places, Montauk State Park
 Turner Mill, Surprise, Missouri
 Lawrence Brook Mill, Milltown, New Jersey
 Elkin Creek Mill, Elkin, North Carolina
 Emlenton Mill, Venango County, Pennsylvania destroyed by fire in 2015
 Fought's Mill, Pennsylvania
 GT Wilburn Grist Mill, Fall River, Tennessee
 Saffold Mill, Seguin Texas
 Swift Creek Mill, Chesterfield County Virginia, a circa 1663 grist mill now operated as a professional nonprofit theatre
 Audra State Park, West Virginia
 Valley Falls State Park, West Virginia
 McMullins Mill, former circa 1810? McMullan Rice Plantation mill on Rice Mill Road and Lewis St, Hartwell, Georgia

See also 
 Watermill
 List of watermills
 Gristmill

References 

 
Watermills
Watermills
United States